Arkim Martin Robertson (born 2 July 1994) is a Grenadian professional basketball player.

College career
Robertson's talent for basketball was discovered by a college coach who went to the Caribbean to scout an Antiguan player who suited up against Robertson's Grenadan Saint John High School.

Professional career
From 2019 to 2021, he played for KK Adria Oil Škrljevo of the international Alpe Adria Cup and the national Croatian League.

References

External links
Cal State Fullerton bio 
Profile at ESPN
Profile at Eurobasket.com

1994 births
Living people
Cal State Fullerton Titans men's basketball players
Centers (basketball)
Grenadian expatriate sportspeople in the United States
Grenadian expatriates in Argentina
Grenadian expatriates in Brazil
Grenadian expatriates in Chile
Grenadian expatriates in Croatia
Grenadian expatriates in Switzerland
Grenadian men's basketball players
KK Škrljevo players